The Fermat primality test is a probabilistic test to determine whether a number is a probable prime.

Concept
Fermat's little theorem states that if p is prime and a is not divisible by p, then

If one wants to test whether p is prime, then we can pick random integers a not divisible by p and see whether the equality holds. If the equality does not hold for a value of a, then p is composite. This congruence is unlikely to hold for a random a if p is composite. Therefore, if the equality does hold for one or more values of a, then we say that p is probably prime.

It also holds trivially for  if p is odd, for the same reason. That is why one usually chooses a random a in the interval .

Any a such that 

when n is composite is known as a Fermat liar. In this case n is called Fermat pseudoprime to base a.

If we do pick an a such that 

then a is known as a Fermat witness for the compositeness of n.

Example 
Suppose we wish to determine whether n = 221 is prime. Randomly pick 1 < a < 220, say a = 38. We check the above equality and find that it holds:

Either 221 is prime, or 38 is a Fermat liar, so we take another a, say 24:

So 221 is composite and 38 was indeed a Fermat liar. Furthermore, 24 is a Fermat witness for the compositeness of 221.

Algorithm
The algorithm can be written as follows:
Inputs: n: a value to test for primality, n>3; k: a parameter that determines the number of times to test for primality
Output: composite if n is composite, otherwise probably prime
Repeat k times:
Pick a randomly in the range [2, n − 2]
If , then return composite
If composite is never returned: return probably prime

The a values 1 and n-1 are not used as the equality holds for all n and all odd n respectively, hence testing them adds no value.

Complexity 

Flaw
There are infinitely many Fermat pseudoprimes to any given basis a>1.
Even worse, there are infinitely many Carmichael numbers. For these numbers, repeated application of the Fermat primality test performs the same as a simple random search for factors. While Carmichael numbers are substantially rarer than prime numbers (Erdös' upper bound for the number of Carmichael numbers is lower than the prime number function n/log(n)) there are enough of them that Fermat's primality test is not often used in the above form. Instead, other more powerful extensions of the Fermat test, such as Baillie–PSW, Miller–Rabin, and Solovay–Strassen are more commonly used.

In general, if  is a composite number that is not a Carmichael number, then at least half of all

 (i.e. )

are Fermat witnesses. Then

Applications

As mentioned above, most applications use a Miller–Rabin or Baillie–PSW test for primality.  Sometimes a Fermat test (along with some trial division by small primes) is performed first to improve performance.  GMP since version 3.0 uses a base-210 Fermat test after trial division and before running Miller–Rabin tests.  Libgcrypt uses a similar process with base 2 for the Fermat test, but OpenSSL does not.

In practice with most big number libraries such as GMP, the Fermat test is not noticeably faster than a Miller–Rabin test, and can be slower for many inputs.

As an exception, OpenPFGW uses only the Fermat test for probable prime testing.  The program is typically used with multi-thousand digit inputs with a goal of maximum speed with very large inputs.  Another well known program that relies only on the Fermat test is PGP where it is only used for testing of self-generated large random values (an open source counterpart, GNU Privacy Guard, uses a Fermat pretest followed by Miller–Rabin tests).

References

 

Primality tests
Modular arithmetic